In chemistry, a catalyst support is the material, usually a solid with a high surface area, to which a catalyst is affixed. The activity of heterogeneous catalysts is mainly promoted by atoms present at the accessible surface of the material. Consequently, great effort is made to maximize the specific surface area of a catalyst. One popular method for increasing surface area involves distributing the catalyst over the surface of the support. The support may be inert or participate in the catalytic reactions. Typical supports include various kinds of activated carbon, alumina, and silica.

Applying catalysts to supports
Two main methods are used to prepare supported catalysts.  In the impregnation method, a suspension of the solid support is treated with a solution of a precatalyst, and the resulting material is then activated under conditions that will convert the precatalyst (often a metal salt) to a more active state, perhaps the metal itself.  In such cases, the catalyst support is usually in the form of pellets.  Alternatively, supported catalysts can be prepared from homogeneous solution by co-precipitation.  For example, an acidic solution of aluminium salts and precatalyst are treated with base to precipitate the mixed hydroxide, which is subsequently calcined.

Supports are usually thermally very stable and withstand processes required to activate precatalysts.  For example, many precatalysts are activated by exposure to a stream of hydrogen at high temperatures.  Similarly, catalysts become fouled after extended use, and in such cases they are sometimes re-activated by oxidation-reduction cycles, again at high temperatures.   The Phillips catalyst, consisting of chromium oxide supported on silica, is activated by a stream of hot air.

Spillover 
Supports are often viewed as inert: catalysis occurs at the catalytic "islands" and the support exists to provide high surface areas.  Various experiments indicate that this model is often oversimplified. It is known for example that adsorbates, such as hydrogen and oxygen, can interact with and even migrate from island to island across the support without re-entering the gas phase.  This process where adsorbates migrate to and from the support is called spillover.  It is envisaged, for example, that hydrogen can "spill" onto oxidic support perhaps as hydroxy groups.

Catalyst leaching
For insufficient interaction between catalyst and support, leaching of the catalyst may occur over time and after extended use of a supported catalyst. Leaching is detrimental for environmental and commercial reasons. For electrophilic catalysts this issue may be addressed by choosing a more basic support. This strategy may negatively affect the catalyst activity, therefore a subtle balance between leaching and activity is required.

Strong metal-support interaction
Strong metal-support interaction is another case highlighting the oversimplification that heterogeneous catalysts are merely supported on an inert substance. The original evidence was provided by the finding that particles of platinum bind H2 with the stoichiometry PtH2 for each surface atom regardless of whether the platinum is supported or not. When, however, supported on titanium dioxide, Pt no longer binds with H2 with the same stoichiometry. This difference is attributed to the electronic influence of the titania on the platinum, otherwise called strong metal-support interaction.

Heterogenized molecular catalysis
Molecular catalysts, consisting of transition metal complexes, have been immobilized on catalyst supports. The resulting material in principle combines features of both homogeneous catalysts – well defined metal complex structures – with the advantages of heterogeneous catalysts – recoverability and ease of handling. Many modalities have been developed for attaching metal complex catalysts to a support. However, the technique has not proven commercially viable, usually because the heterogenized transition metal complexes are leached from, or deactivated by, the support.

Supports for electrocatalysis 
Supports are used to give mechanical stability to catalyst nanoparticles or powders. Supports immobilize the particle reducing its mobility and favouring the chemical stabilization: they can be considered as solid capping agents. Supports also allow the nanoparticles to be easily recycled.

One of the most promising supports is graphene for its porosity, electronic properties, thermal stability and active surface area.

Examples

Almost all major heterogeneous catalysts are supported as illustrated in the table hereafter.

See also

References